Advi Somnal  is a village in the southern state of Karnataka, India. It is located in the Muddebihal taluk of Bijapur district in Karnataka.

See also
 Bijapur district
 Districts of Karnataka
Adavi somanal is called as Sharan Somanal this village is located near Huvin hipparagi, Because of Shree Sharan Basavalingappa sharan this village name is called as Sharan somanal and Shree Sharan Basavalingappa Temple is located at this village

References

External links
 http://Bijapur.nic.in/ 

Villages in Bijapur district, Karnataka